Southern Bight, also known as the Flanders Bight, and (in Dutch) the Hoofden, is the southern bight of the North Sea bounded by the coasts of the Netherlands, Belgium, France and Great Britain. The Southern Bight is south west of the German Bight and the Wadden Sea.  The Southern Bight is roughly delimited in the north by a roughly straight line between The Wash and the West Frisian Islands going south of the Dogger Bank, a large shallow part in the North Sea, and the Outer Silver Pit, a deep water channel south of the Dogger Bank.
It corresponds to sea area Thames and the northern part of sea area Dover.

There are many sand banks in the Southern Bight. From the Strait of Dover to the Norfolk Banks, there is a deep water channel, which enters into wherein the water is about 30 metres deep or deeper. At the end of the English Channel, this depth increases to about 100 metres.

The North Sea as a whole has characteristics which are similar to those of the Atlantic Ocean, whereas the Southern Bight has hydrography characteristics which most resemble those of the English Channel, and the inputs from various European rivers.  The bight's four main river sources are the Rhine, Meuse, Scheldt and the Thames, but it is also impacted by the Ems, Elbe, and Humber.

See also
Atlantic Ocean
North Sea
Wadden Sea

References

External links
Umfangreicher Aufsatz zur geologischen Entwicklung der Southern Bight (English)

Bodies of water of the North Sea
Bights (geography)